is a city located in Osaka Prefecture, Japan. , the city had an estimated population of 228,802 in 111,545 households and a population density of 9,300 persons per km2.

Geography
Neyagawa is located on the left bank of the Yodo River in the northeastern part of Osaka Prefecture, 15 km from the center of Osaka city and 35 km from the center of Kyoto city. It is 7.22 km north–south, 6.89 km east–west. The city's terrain can be broadly divided into eastern hills and western flatlands. The eastern hills are part of the Ikoma Mountains, about 50m above sea level, and the flat western part is mainly composed of alluvium and is 2 to 3m above sea level. The highest point is 109.6m around the Ishinohōden Kofun.

Neighboring municipalities
Osaka Prefecture
 Settsu
 Takatsuki
 Hirakata
 Katano
 Shijōnawate
 Kadoma
 Moriguchi

Climate
Neyagawa has a Humid subtropical climate (Köppen Cfa) characterized by warm summers and cool winters with light to no snowfall.  The average annual temperature in Neyagawa is 15.1 °C. The average annual rainfall is 1475 mm with September as the wettest month. The temperatures are highest on average in August, at around 27.1 °C, and lowest in January, at around 3.7 °C.

Demographics
Per Japanese census data, the population of Neyagawa increased extremely rapidly in the 1960s, leveled off until the 2000s and has slowly started to decrease.

History
The area of the modern city of Neyagawa was within ancient Kawachi Province. The village of Kukasho was established within Matta District with the creation of the modern municipalities system on April 1, 1889.  On April 1, 1896, the area became part of Kitakawachi District, Osaka. Kukasho was elevated to town status on February 1, 1943. On April 1, 1943, it was merged with the villages of Tomorogi, Toyono and Neyagawa to form the city of Neyagawa.

Government
Neyagawa has a mayor-council form of government with a directly elected mayor and a unicameral city council of 24 members. Neyagawa contributes two members to the Osaka Prefectural Assembly. In terms of national politics, the city is part of Osaka 12th district of the lower house of the Diet of Japan.

Economy
Neyagawa is a regional commercial center with some high manufacturing.

Education

Universities and colleges
 Setsunan University
 Osaka Electro-Communication University

Primary and secondary education
Neyagawa has 24 public elementary schools and ten public middle schools operated by the city government and three public high schools operated by the Osaka Prefectural Department of Education. There is also one private elementary school and two private combined middle/high schools. The prefecture also operates one special education school for the handicapped and one technical school.

Transportation

Railway
 JR West – Katamachi Line (Gakkentoshi Line) 
 
 Keihan Electric Railway - Keihan Main Line
  -  -

Highway
  Second Keihan Highway

Sister city relations
  Susami, Wakayama, Japan - Friendship city agreement concluded in 1976
  Mimasaka, Okayama, Japan - Friendship city agreement concluded in 1991 (with former Ohara town)
  Newport News, Virginia United States - Sister city agreement concluded in 1982
  Oakville, Ontario, Canada - Sister city agreement concluded in 1984
  Luwan District, Shanghai, China - Friendship city agreement concluded in 1994. Luwan has since been merged into Huangpu District since June 2011.

Local attractions
Ishinohōden Kofun, National Historic Site

Notable people from Neyagawa
 Gōeidō Gōtarō, sumo wrestler, ranked at ōzeki
 Masaki Okimoto, professional wrestler
 Nana Okada, Japanese idol, singer, member of J-pop girl group AKB48, former member of STU48 
 Koji Uehara, baseball player, member of the 2013 World Series champion Boston Red Sox 
 Yoshiyuki Fuchiwaki, former baseball player (Osaka Kintetsu Buffaloes, Nippon Professional Baseball) 
 Yumi Yoshimura, Japanese idol, singer and musician, member of J-pop duo PUFFY 
 Mio Ootani, Japanese gravure idol
 Ryo Tadokoro, Japanese football player (Yokohama FC, J1 League) 
 Hiroshi Ōsaka, Japanese animator, character designer and illustrator 
 Fujiwara, Japanese comedy duo 
 Tomokatsu Kitagawa, Japanese politician
 Kaoru Tada, Japanese manga artist 
 Naoto Tsuru, baseball player (Hanshin Tigers, Nippon Professional Baseball - Central League) 
 Naoki Matayoshi, Japanese comedian, screenwriter, and novelist 
 Yuri Nakamura, Zainichi Korean actress and former singer 
 Daiki Numa, Japanese footballer (Vonds Ichihara, Kantō Soccer League)
 Koji Uehara, former baseball player 
 Emiko Ueno, former female badminton player 
 Ura Kazuki, sumo wrestler

References

External links

 Neyagawa City official website 

 
Cities in Osaka Prefecture